The Philippines competed at the 1972 Summer Olympics in Munich, West Germany. The Philippines sent its biggest delegation in the history of the Olympic Games with 53 athletes, 48 men and 5 women.

Archery

In the first postwar archery competition at the Olympics, the Philippines entered three men. Their highest placed competitor was Francisco Naranjilla, in 37th place.

Men's Individual Competition:
 Francisco Naranjilla — 2288 points (→ 37th place)
 Carlos Santos, Jr. — 2183 points (→ 50th place)
 Ramon Aldea — 2102 points (→ 54th place)

Athletics

Men's 100 metres
Tukal Mokalam
 First Heat — 11.02s (→ did not advance)

Women's Discus Throw
Josephine de la Viña
 Qualifying Round — 53.29 m (→ did not advance)

Basketball

Men's Team Competition
Pool Play (Group B)
 Lost to Soviet Union (80-111)
 Lost to Italy (81-101)
 Lost to Yugoslavia (76-117) 
 Lost to Puerto Rico (72-92)
 Lost to West Germany (74-93)
 Lost to Poland (75-90)
 Defeated Senegal (68-72)
Semifinal Round
 Defeated Egypt (2-0, forfeit) 
Final Round
 Defeated Japan (80-73) → did not advance, 13th place

Team Roster
William "Bogs" Adornado
Narciso Bernardo
Ricardo "Joy" Cleofas
Danny Florencio
Jaime "Jimmy" Mariano
Rosalio "Yoyong" Martirez
Rogelio "Tembong" Melencio
Edgardo "Ed" Ocampo (c)
Manny Paner
Jun Papa
Marte Samson
Freddie Webb
Head Coach: Ignacio "Ning" Ramos
Team Manager: Domingo Itchon

Boxing

Men's Light Flyweight (– 48 kg)
Vicente Arsenal 
 First Round — Lost to James Odwori (UGA), TKO-2

Men's Flyweight (– 51 kg)
 Reynaldo Fortaleza
 First Round — Lost to Fujio Nagai (JPN), 1:4

Men's Light Middleweight (– 71 kg)
Nicolas Aquilino
 First Round — Bye 
 Second Round — Lost to Evengelos Oikonomakos (GRE), 0:5

Cycling

One cyclist represented the Philippines in 1972.

Individual road race
 Maximo Junta — did not finish (→ no ranking)

 Individual pursuit
 Maximo Junta

Judo

Geronimo Dyogi
Renato Repuyan

Sailing

Soling
Mario Almario
Alfonso Qua
Ambrosio Santos

Shooting

Eight male shooters represented the Philippines in 1972.

25 m pistol
 Rafael Recto
 Tom Ong

50 m pistol
 Arturo Macapagal
 Teodoro Kalaw

50 m rifle, three positions
 Lodovico Espinosa

50 m rifle, prone
 Lodovico Espinosa

Trap
 Manuel Valdes

Skeet
 Melchor Yap
 Raymundo Quitoriano

SwimmingMen's 100m FreestyleLuis Ayesa
 Heat — DNS (→  did not advance)Men's 200m FreestyleLuis Ayesa
 Heat — 2:05.97 (→  did not advance)Men's 4 × 100 m Freestyle RelayLuis Ayesa, Dae Imlani, Carlos Singson Brosas and Jairulla Jaitulla 
 Heat — 3:47.39 (→  did not advance)Men's 4 × 200 m Freestyle RelayDae Imlani, Edwin Borja, Carlos Brosas, and Jairulla Jaitulla
 Heat — 8:44.01 (→  did not advance)

WeightliftingMen's 56 kgArturo del RosarioMen's 52 kg'''
Nigel Trance
Salvador del Rosario

Wrestling

References

External links
Official Olympic Reports

Nations at the 1972 Summer Olympics
1972 Summer Olympics
Summer Olympics